Teratozephyrus doni, the suroifui hairstreak, is a small butterfly found in India that belongs to the lycaenids or blues family.

Taxonomy
The butterfly was previously classified as Thecla doni Tytler.

Range
The butterfly occurs in India in Manipur.

Status
Very rare.

See also
List of butterflies of India (Lycaenidae)

Cited references

References
  
 
 
 
 

Teratozephyrus
Butterflies of Asia